The Pakistan cricket team toured the Netherlands to play three One Day International (ODI) matches in August 2022. The ODI series formed part of the inaugural 2020–2023 ICC Cricket World Cup Super League. It was the first bilateral ODI series between the two teams.

Background
Pakistan were originally scheduled to tour the Netherlands in July 2020 to play three ODI matches, ahead of their tour of England. It would have been the first bilateral series between the two sides. Pakistan were also scheduled to play a two-match Twenty20 International (T20I) series against Ireland following this series. However, on 22 April 2020, the Dutch government announced that it had banned all events in the country, both sports and cultural, until 1 September 2020 due to the COVID-19 pandemic in the Netherlands.

In April 2022, both the Pakistan Cricket Board (PCB) and the Royal Dutch Cricket Association (KNCB) agreed on rescheduling the series for August 2022. Later the same month both cricket boards agreed the itinerary for the tour, with all the matches taking place in Rotterdam.

Squads

ODI series

1st ODI

2nd ODI

3rd ODI

References

External links
 Series home at ESPN Cricinfo

2020 in Dutch cricket
2022 in Dutch cricket
2020 in Pakistani cricket
2022 in Pakistani cricket
International cricket competitions in 2022
Pakistani cricket tours abroad
Cricket events postponed due to the COVID-19 pandemic